Paper Tigers is the fourth studio album by Swedish band Caesars, released on 26 April 2005. The album was released on Virgin in the United Kingdom, Astralwerks in the United States and Toshiba-EMI in Japan. The album contains the re-release of the song "Jerk It Out."

Recording
Recording for Paper Tigers first began in the winter of 2003 at Silence Studio. The sessions then moved to Joakim Åhlund's Decibel Studio, in Stockholm. The album was mixed in New York by Michael Brauer.

Track listing

Personnel
The following people contributed to Paper Tigers:

Caesars
 César Vidal – lead vocals, guitar
 Joakim Åhlund – audio Production, guitar, mixing, producer
 Nino Keller – Drums, vocals
 David Lindquist – bass guitar

Additional personnel
 Hector Araya – strings
 Chris Athens – mastering
 Michael Brauer – mixing
 Lasse Mårtén – engineer
 Kristoffer Nergårdh – piano
 Pontus Olsson – engineer
 Ismail Samie – A&R
 Fredrik Wennerlund – photography
 Björn Yttling – Farfisa organ, phillycorda

Reception

Paper Tigers has received mixed to positive reviews. On the review aggregate site Metacritic, the album has a 63 out of 100, indicating "generally favorable reviews."

David Browne of Entertainment Weekly gave the album an A grade, writing that the album was "one meaty, vigorous track after another of modern-Mersey-beat pop..." Browne concluded his review with: "All retro rock should sound this good." In another positive review, The Guardian's Dave Simpson wrote that Paper Tigers "is a treasure waiting to be found by the rest of us," and called the album "simultaneously ecstatic and melancholy."

On the other hand, Allmusic's Heather Phares criticized the album, writing that beyond "Jerk It Out," "It's Not the Fall That Hurts" and "Soulchaser," there were not many other memorable songs on the album. Stephen Haag of Popmatters also criticized the album's lack of memorable tracks, writing "If folks are purchasing Paper Tigers expecting a dozen more tunes like 'Jerk It Out'... they’ll soon find that Caesars is guilty of bait-and-switch." In another mixed review, Marc Hogan of Pitchfork Media described the album as "...one or two decent singles surrounded by a bunch of mediocre-or-worse filler."

Singles
"We Got To Leave" - released 16 February 2005.
"Jerk It Out" - released 18 April 2005 on Virgin Records in the UK
This single has been featured on iPod shuffle advertisements, the British television series "Teachers" and on the video games "FIFA Football 2004", SSX 3, and as downloadable content for Rock Band 3.
CD DINSD274: "Jerk It Out" / "The Longer We Stay Together"
"7" DINS274: "Jerk It Out" / "Up All Night"

Charts

Album

Singles

References

External links
Official Myspace page
Label website

Caesars (band) albums
2005 albums
Virgin Records albums
Astralwerks albums